Cobra is a 1986 American action film directed by George P. Cosmatos and written by Sylvester Stallone, who also starred in the title role. The film co-stars Reni Santoni, Brigitte Nielsen and Andrew Robinson. The film was loosely based on the novel A Running duck by Paula Gosling, which was later filmed under the title Fair Game in 1995. However, Stallone's screenplay was originally conceived from ideas he had during pre-production of Beverly Hills Cop, whose screenplay he heavily revised. He had wanted to make Beverly Hills Cop a less comedic and more action-oriented film, which the studio rejected as being far too expensive. When he left that project, Eddie Murphy was brought in to play the lead role.

The film received generally negative reviews, with much criticism focused on the overuse of genre tropes and excessive violence. It debuted at the number one spot on the U.S. box office, and earned $49 million in the US and a total of $160 million worldwide. It has come to be considered a cult classic.

Plot
After a failure of negotiations between a lone armed gunman and law enforcement during a hostage crisis at a Los Angeles supermarket, the LAPD summons Lieutenant Marion Cobretti (Stallone), a member of its elite division known as the "Zombie Squad". Cobretti, addressed by his codename "Cobra", infiltrates the store, locates, and negotiates with the gunman, who threatens him by speaking of a vague and unknown organization known as "The New World", a supremacist group of social Darwinist radicals that despise modern society and believe in killing the weak, leaving only the strongest and smartest to rule the world. Cobretti then kills the gunman by throwing a knife at his abdomen and then shooting him dead.

As the hostages and bodies are removed from the store, Cobretti is admonished by Detective Monte (Robinson) for his seeming disregard for police procedures and protocols. Harassed by reporters, Cobretti admonishes them for failing to prioritize the safety of potential victims. Little does everyone realize at the time that the supermarket hostage crisis is only one of a string of recent and seemingly unconnected acts of violence and murder that have broken loose in Los Angeles, perpetrated by the same supremacist group the supermarket gunman mentioned.

Model and businesswoman Ingrid Knudsen (Nielsen) later becomes the New World's priority target after witnessing their members and their leader, only identified as "The Night Slasher" (Thompson), going on a killing spree. She is placed under the protective custody of Cobretti and his partner, Sergeant Tony Gonzales (Santoni) after a failed attempt on her. When several more failed attempts are made on their lives by various people connected to the New World, Cobretti theorizes that there is an entire army of killers operating with the same modus operandi rather than a lone serial killer with some associates, but his suggestion is rebuffed by his superiors. However, the LAPD agrees with Cobretti that it will be safest if he and Knudsen relocate from the city.

Cobretti becomes romantically involved with Ingrid shortly after venturing out into the countryside, but Nancy Stalk (Garlington), the New World's second-in-command and right-hand woman, infiltrates the police team escorting the Cobretti party and compromises their whereabouts. Despite Cobretti's suspicions and mistrust of Nancy, he does nothing and the party spends the night in a motel complex. The organization moves in at dawn and besieges the small town. With barely enough time to react, the attackers storm the motel complex, wounding Gonzales in the process. Killing several members but with more swarming into the town, Cobretti and Ingrid escape in a pickup truck. When the truck is severely damaged from the chase, the duo cut through a grapefruit plantation to escape into a nearby factory.

Cobretti has defeated most of the New World by this point, with the few remaining members following them into the building. Cobretti eliminates every member and the Night Slasher accidentally shoots Nancy, leaving just himself. Cobretti and the Night Slasher engage in a vicious melee combat inside the steel mill, ending with the latter being impaled in the back by a large roaming hook, which transports him into a furnace that burns him alive.

In the aftermath, Cobretti's department arrives and begins clean-up of the town, rendering medical aid to Gonzales. Detective Monte appears apologetic but confronts Cobretti again about his lack of regard for police protocols, offering to discuss the issue over a long dinner. Cobretti punches Monte instead, before he and Ingrid ride away on one of the motorcycles left by the New World.

Cast

Production

Development and writing
When Sylvester Stallone was signed to play the lead in Beverly Hills Cop, he decided to rewrite the script almost completely, removing nearly all the comedic aspects and turning it into an action movie that he felt was better suited to him. The studio read his revised script and rejected it. The proposed action scenes would have increased the budget far beyond what they planned. Stallone later channeled his ideas for it into an original script.

The novel Fair Game by Paula Gosling was cited as source material, enough so that she received a screen credit. 

Sylvester Stallone's earlier draft of the script contained many differences from later drafts and the final film. These include: the opening shootout taking place in a movie theater (instead of a grocery store), during which many more people are killed; Cobra mentioning how he had a girlfriend who was killed by a psychopath he was trying to catch; an additional big nighttime action sequence on a boat where Cobra and Ingrid are hiding and are attacked by the Night Slasher's cult members, with Cobra and Gonzalez managing to kill them all; and a different ending, in which it's revealed that Monte was the actual leader of the New World cult and when he tries to kill Ingrid he is shot and killed by Cobra.

The line, "This is where the law stops and I start, sucker!", was inspired by a line spoken by Steve McQueen in The Reivers.

Cobra needed much additional editing because the film was so graphically violent that it originally received an X rating. It was edited to receive an R rating.

The movie is also notable for its multiple usages of the word ‘foundry’ in dialogue, with the instance count of two eclipsing all other contemporary films.

Casting

Brian Thompson auditioned seven times before he was hired. On the fourth audition he met Stallone, who thought that Thompson was too nice to play the Night Slasher. But after a screen test, he immediately got the job. Also, in the original script, the Night Slasher was called Abaddon, possibly after the "angel of the abyss" from the Bible.

Thompson repeatedly sought Stallone's advice about how to play the Night Slasher, including questions about his background and personal motivations, but Stallone showed no interest in the subject and told Thompson that the character was simply evil. In an unfortunate surprise for Thompson, after filming was completed, director Cosmatos unexpectedly told him: "You could have been good if you had listened to me."

Stallone acknowledge Dirty Harry as an influence and Cobra reunited two actors from the film: Reni Santoni and Andy Robinson.

Brigitte Nielsen, Stallone's then-wife who he had met filming Rocky IV, was cast as Ingrid Knudsen.

Filming
Originally, Cobra was supposed to be filmed in Seattle, climaxing with a motorcycle chase scene on a ferry between the islands. Even though everything was prepared to start filming the final theatrical version of the scene at night, Stallone demanded the ending be changed because of the mosquito problem at that time, which would have made night time filming very difficult to endure.

The supporting cast and extras were forbidden from talking to Stallone on set.

At one point during filming, Stallone complained to cinematographer Ric Waite that they were falling behind and that he needed to push his crew to work harder. Waite responded by telling Stallone that the delays were due to his fooling around with Brigitte Nielsen and showing off for his bodyguards. Although Stallone was shocked that somebody would talk to him that way, he cleaned up his act and behaved more professionally, although he returned to his old egocentric behavior a few weeks later. Waite later said in an interview that, despite his huge ego, Stallone had a great sense of humor. He said George P. Cosmatos would have made a great producer, but he was a terrible director.

For the Night Slasher's monologue in the lead-up to the final fight, Brian Thompson did the scene with the script supervisor standing in for Stallone, who was busy watching a basketball game on TV.

The custom 1950 Mercury driven by Cobretti was actually owned by Sylvester Stallone. The studio produced stunt doubles of the car for use in some of the action sequences, such as the jump from the second floor of the parking garage. The production built three "Cobra cars" for stunt work. Although they were identical on the outside, their moving parts were designed for specific sequences, involving high-speed swipes with other vehicles, 180-degree turns, jumps, and 360-degree spins.

The knife used by the Night Slasher was made for the film by knife designer Herman Schneider. Sylvester Stallone asked Schneider to create a knife that audiences would never forget.

Cobretti uses a custom Colt Gold Cup National Match 1911 chambered in 9mm. The 9mm variant was made specifically for the film (normally it fires .45 ACP). Later in the film, he uses a Jati-Matic submachine gun.

Music

An audio cassette and vinyl version were released on September 21, 1986, followed by a CD which was released in 1992 as the Original Motion Picture Soundtrack.

Stan Bush's song "The Touch", heard in Transformers: The Movie (1986), was originally written for Cobra.
The song "Feel The Heat" was overheard during the filming of the video by Jean Beauvoir when they were editing in the same building complex that the video was being filmed. Stallone loved the song, and the rest is history.

Release

Versions

The first rough cut was over two hours long (the closest estimated original running time is 130 minutes). It was then shortened to a roughly two-hour director's cut which was intended to be released in theaters. However, after Top Gun became a smash hit, Stallone and Warner Bros. were worried that Cobra - which would premiere the following week - would be overshadowed, so in order to ensure at least one extra screening each day the movie was heavily re-edited. Stallone removed much of the plot and scenes involving characters other than his own. Warner Bros. also demanded that the more graphic scenes be cut down or removed entirely because they were "too intense," and that some action scenes be cut for pacing. The extended television version of the film is approximately 6 minutes longer than the theatrical release. When first submitted to the MPAA the film received an X rating, necessitating even more cuts.

Reception

Box office
Cobra opened the widest for a Warner Bros. release at the time opening on 2,131 screens and debuted at number one at the U.S. box office with a Memorial Day weekend debut of $15.7 million. It eventually went on to gross $160 million, over six times its estimated $25 million budget. According to The New York Times, the film was still considered a disappointment because its $48 million at the box office in the US did not live up to the success of Rambo.

Critical response
On Rotten Tomatoes, the film has an approval rating of 18% based on 22 reviews, with an average rating of 3.40/10. The website's consensus reads, "A disengaged Sylvester Stallone plays the titular Cobra with no bite in this leaden action thriller, queasily fixated on wanton carnage and nothing else." On Metacritic, the film has a weighted average score of 25 out of 100 based on 9 critics, indicating "generally unfavorable reviews". Audiences polled by CinemaScore gave the film a grade "B" on scale of A to F.

TV Guide stated that "Stallone's character is an empty hulk...the few attempts to provide us with little insights into his character are downright laughable." Nina Darnton of The New York Times opined that the film "pretends to be against the wanton violence of a disintegrating society, but it's really the apotheosis of that violence....[it] shows such contempt for the most basic American values", and Vincent Canby called it "disturbing for the violence it portrays, the ideas it represents and the large number of people who will undoubtedly go to see it and cheer on its dangerous hero." Sheila Benson of the Los Angeles Times panned the film, saying "Cobra's pretentious emptiness, its dumbness, its two-faced morality make it a movie that begs to be laughed off."

Variety called it "a sleek, extremely violent and exciting police thriller" and compared Cobra favorably to Rocky and Rambo.

Gene Siskel of the Chicago Tribune compared Cobra to Dirty Harry when giving the film 2 and 1/2 stars and summarizing it as "Filthy Harry". He wrote: "Whereas Clint Eastwood simply would have squinted at Robinson, Stallone takes a more violent approach. Maybe that's the difference between actors--Eastwood can be droll; Stallone more often crosses the border to primeval." Siskel and Roger Ebert did not give the film a feature review on their TV show, but both gave it negative attention during a late-1986 segment on new video releases, in which Siskel noted that the film had a great opening sequence (the supermarket hostage scene) and couldn't maintain the momentum. Ebert lamented that Stallone was squandering his talent and vast potential.

The 1996 movie guide "Seen That, Now What?", the film was given the rating of "C-", stating that the film is "a graceless vigilante thriller that's strictly for hard-core[sic] action junkies."

Then-U.S. President Ronald Reagan viewed this film at Camp David on June 6, 1986.

Accolades
Cobra was nominated for six Razzie Awards, including Worst Picture, Worst Actor (Sylvester Stallone), Worst Actress (Brigitte Nielsen), Worst Supporting Actor and Worst New Star (both for Brian Thompson) and Worst Screenplay.

Director Nicolas Winding Refn is a huge fan of Cobra. In Refn's cult film Drive the main character has a toothpick in his mouth in some scenes; this is Refn's homage to the opening scene where Stallone has a matchstick in his mouth. The main star of the film, Ryan Gosling, also said in interview that he is a fan of Stallone and Cobra which is why he "borrowed" his character's toothpick habit from Cobra.

Other media

Video game

In 1986, the film was made into a video game by Ocean Software for the ZX Spectrum, Commodore 64, and Amstrad CPC.

Aborted sequel and remake
In 1987, Cannon Films, along with Warner Bros. attempted to make a sequel, Cobra Part II, but the film never materialized.

In May 2019 at the Cannes Film Festival, Stallone discussed that a remake is in development in the form of a television series. By September of the same year, he confirmed the project is moving forward with Robert Rodriguez serving as director/creator. The studios involved have not-yet decided whether it will be a film or television adaptation.

See also
 List of American films of 1986
 1986 in film
 Sylvester Stallone filmography

References

External links
 
 
 
 
 

1986 films
1986 action films
American action thriller films
1980s chase films
1980s English-language films
Fictional portrayals of the Los Angeles Police Department
Films based on American novels
Films directed by George P. Cosmatos
Films set in Los Angeles
American Christmas films
Films shot in California
Golan-Globus films
American police detective films
Films with screenplays by Sylvester Stallone
American serial killer films
American slasher films
Warner Bros. films
Films scored by Sylvester Levay
1980s slasher films
Films about witness protection
Films produced by Menahem Golan
Films produced by Yoram Globus
1980s American films